This is a list of songs written by Barry Mann and Cynthia Weil, in most cases as a songwriting duo.  The pair have also collaborated with other songwriters.  Both Mann and Weil have also written chart hit songs as individuals with other writers, and Mann has written on his own.

Chart hits and other notable songs written by Mann and Weil

Chart hits and other notable songs written by Barry Mann with others or alone

Chart hits and other notable songs written by Cynthia Weil with others

References

Mann and Weil